Coreura engelkei is a moth of the subfamily Arctiinae. It was described by Rothschild in 1912. It is found in Colombia.

References

Euchromiina
Moths described in 1912